Policlinico is a station on Line B of the Rome Metro. It is named after the nearby Policlinico Umberto I. It is located in Piazza Sassari, at the intersection with Viale Regina Margherita, Viale Regina Elena and Via Giovanni Maria Lancisi. It was opened in 1990.

Surroundings 
 Eastman Dental Hospital Rome
 Università degli studi di Roma "La Sapienza"

Services
 Ticket machine
 Accessibility for the Handicap
 Elevator
 Escalators
 Station video surveillance
 Newsstand
 Vending machines for snacks and drinks
 Public transport surface
 Ad sound arrival and departure trains
 SOS services

References

External links 

Rome Metro Line B stations
Railway stations opened in 1990
1990 establishments in Italy
Rome Q. V Nomentano
Railway stations in Italy opened in the 20th century